The Mitsubishi 4G9 engine is a series of straight-4 automobile engines produced by Mitsubishi Motors. All are 16-valve, and use both single- and double- overhead camshaft heads. Some feature MIVEC variable valve timing, and it was the first modern gasoline direct injection engine upon its introduction in August 1996.

4G91
The 4G91 was a short-lived model, mainly built between 1991 and 1995 and rarely seen in export markets.

Applications
 Mitsubishi Lancer
 Mitsubishi Mirage

4G92
The 4G92 displaces . It first appeared in the late-1991 Japanese-spec Mirage RS and Super R in DOHC form. In the original DOHC 16V form it produces . Later, a fuel-efficient SOHC version was added, but the 4G92 is best known in its high-performance MIVEC equipped DOHC version, which fully replaced "ordinary" DOHC in 1993. A modular displacement (MD) version of the 4G92 MIVEC was also produced – MD is Mitsubishi's cylinder deactivation system which helps improve fuel consumption.

4G92P SOHC 16 Valve
 Total Displacement - 
 Bore - 
 Stroke - 
 Compression Ratio - 10.0:1
(1): Early European and JDM versions with 20°/42° intake and 54°/2° exhaust valve timing
(2): General export and later European versions with 14°/58° intake and 52°/16° exhaust valve timing

4G92 DOHC 16 Valve
 Total Displacement - 
 Bore - 
 Stroke - 
 Compression Ratio - 11.0:1
 Maximum Output -  at 7,000 rpm
 Maximum Torque -  at 4,500 rpm

4G92-MIVEC DOHC 16 Valve
 Total Displacement - 
 Bore - 
 Stroke - 
 Compression Ratio - 11.0:1
 Maximum Output -  at 7,500 rpm
 Maximum Torque -  at 7,000 rpm

Applications
 Mitsubishi Lancer
 Mitsubishi Mirage
 Mitsubishi Carisma
 Proton Wira
 Proton Satria

4G93

The 4G93 is  a  engine available in both SOHC and DOHC versions. Turbocharged variants are also produced. In mid 1996 Mitsubishi released a gasoline direct injection (GDI) version of the 4G93. This GDI model saw a production of over a million units though it was a heavy polluter therefore only sold in the Japanese market. A partially cleaned up version (with less power) was later sold in Europe, and was among the first of the modern GDI engines. It brought good fuel economy and, if well serviced, long engine life.

4G93 SOHC 16 Valve MPI
 Multi-Point Injection (MPI)
 Total Displacement - 
 Bore - 
 Stroke - 
 Compression Ratio - 9.5:1
 Maximum Output - 
 Maximum Torque - 

4G93 SOHC 16 Valve Carburetor
 Carburetor
 Total Displacement - 
 Bore - 
 Stroke - 
 Compression Ratio - 9.5:1
 Maximum Output - 
 Maximum Torque - 

4G93 DOHC 16 Valve MPI
 Multi-Point Injection (MPI)
 Total Displacement - 
 Bore - 
 Stroke - 
 Compression Ratio - 10.5:1
 Maximum Output -  @ 6,500 rpm
 Maximum Torque -  @ 5500 rpm

4G93T DOHC 16 Valve Turbo
 Multi-Point Injection (MPI) with TD04 turbocharger
 Total Displacement - 
 Bore - 
 Stroke - 
 Compression Ratio - 8.5:1 (Upgraded to 9.1:1 in 1994)

4G93 DOHC 16 Valve GDI
 Gasoline Direct Injection (GDI)
 Total Displacement - 
 Bore - 
 Stroke - 
 Compression Ratio - 12.0:1
 Maximum Output - 
 Europe:  at 5,250 rpm /  at 5,500 rpm /  at 5,500 rpm
 Japan:  at 5,500 rpm /  at 6,000 rpm /  at 6,500 rpm
 Maximum Torque -
 Europe:  @ 3,500 rpm /  @ 3,750 rpm
 Japan:  @ 3,500 rpm /  @ 3,750 rpm /  @ 5,000 rpm

4G93 DOHC 16 Valve GDI Turbo
 Gasoline Direct Injection (GDI) with turbocharger
 Total Displacement - 
 Bore - 
 Stroke - 
 Compression Ratio - 10.0:1
 Maximum Output -  @ 5,200 rpm /  @ 5,500 rpm
 Maximum Torque -  @ 3,500 rpm /  @ 3,500 rpm

Applications
 Mitsubishi Space Wagon
 Mitsubishi Space Star
 Mitsubishi Carisma
 Mitsubishi Lancer
 Mitsubishi Libero
 Mitsubishi Mirage
 Mitsubishi FTO
 Proton Wira
 Proton Satria
 Proton Putra
 Mitsubishi Colt GTI
 Mitsubishi Galant 1996
 Mitsubishi Pajero iO / Pajero Pinin / Shogun Pinin / Montero iO / Pajero TR4
 Brilliance BC3
 Brilliance BS6
 Brilliance BS4
 Volvo S40
 Volvo V40

4G94
The 4G94 is a  version built in Japan, used in the Mitsubishi Lancer. It has a cast iron engine block with Multi-point fuel injection and an aluminum SOHC cylinder head with forged steel connecting rods and four valves per cylinder. The 4G94 Also comes in the GDI DOHC variant which can be found in the Mitsubishi Galant.

4G94 SOHC 16 Valve MPI
Multi-Point Injection (MPI)
Total Displacement - 
Bore - 
Stroke - 
Compression Ratio - 9.5:1
Maximum Output -  @ 5,200 rpm
Maximum Torque -  @ 4,250 rpm

4G94 DOHC 16 Valve GDI
Gasoline Direct Injection (GDI)
Bore - 
Stroke - 
Compression Ratio: 11.0:1
Maximum Output:  / 5,700 rpm
Maximum Torque:  / 3,750 rpm
Applications

Applications
 Mitsubishi Pajero iO / Pajero Pinin / Shogun Pinin / Montero iO / Pajero TR4
Mitsubishi Adventure/Mitsubishi Kuda/Mitsubishi Freeca/Soueast Freeca
 Mitsubishi Lancer
 Mitsubishi Galant
 Hawtai Santa Fe

See also
 List of Mitsubishi engines

References

 "The Mitsubishi 4G9x Engine Guide", Michael Knowling, Autospeed, issue 389, July 17, 2006
 "GDI engine production tops 1,000,000 unit mark", Mitsubishi Motors press release, September 11, 2001

4G9
Straight-four engines
Gasoline engines by model